Radiative levitation is the name given to a phenomenon that causes the spectroscopically-derived abundance of heavy elements in the photospheres of hot stars to be very much higher than solar abundance or than the expected bulk abundance; for example, the spectrum of the star Feige 86 has gold and platinum abundances three to ten thousand times higher than solar norms.

The mechanism is that heavier elements have large photon absorption cross-sections when partially ionized (see opacity), so efficiently absorb photons from the radiation coming from the core of the star, and some of the energy of the photons gets converted to outward momentum, effectively 'kicking' the heavy atom towards the photosphere.  The effect is strong enough that very hot white dwarfs are significantly less bright in the EUV and X-ray bands than would be expected from a black-body model.

The countervailing process is gravitational settling, where, in very high gravitational fields, the effects of diffusion even in a hot atmosphere are cancelled out to the point that the heavier elements will sink unobservably to the bottom and lighter elements settle on the top.

See also
 Chemically peculiar star

References 

Stellar phenomena